This article presents a list of the historical events and publications of Australian literature during 1921.

Books 

 William Baylebridge — An Anzac Muster
 Jean Curlewis — The Ship That Never Set Sail
 Dulcie Deamer — Revelation
 Arthur Gask — The Secret of the Sandhills
 Fergus Hume — The Unexpected
 Jack McLaren — The Oil Seekers: The Tale of New Guinea Beach
 Ernest O'Ferrall — Bodger and the Boarders
 Katharine Susannah Prichard — Black Opal
 Steele Rudd — On Emu Creek

Poetry 

 Zora Cross — "Elegy on an Australian Schoolboy"
 C. J. Dennis — A Book for Kids
 Mary E. Fullerton
 "The Selector's Wife"
 "War Time"
 Lesbia Harford
 "Day's End"
 "The Folk I Love"
 "The Invisible People"
 Sumner Locke — In Memoriam: Sumner Locke
 Dorothea Mackellar — "Vestal"
 Furnley Maurice — "Plunder"
 John Shaw Neilson
 "For a Little Girl's Birthday"
 "The Orange Tree"
 "To a School-Girl in Her Fourteenth Year"
 John O'Brien
 Around the Boree Log and Other Verses
 "Said Hanrahan"
 "Tangmalangaloo"
 "The Trimmin's on the Rosary"
 Vance Palmer — "The Snake Children's and Young Adult fiction 

 Mary Grant Bruce — Back to Billabong May Gibbs — Little Obelia, and Further Adventures of Ragged Blossom, Snugglepot & Cuddlepie Ethel Turner — King Anne Drama 

 Vance Palmer — A Happy Family''

Births 

A list, ordered by date of birth (and, if the date is either unspecified or repeated, ordered alphabetically by surname) of births in 1921 of Australian literary figures, authors of written works or literature-related individuals follows, including year of death.

 25 January — Russell Braddon, novelist (died 1995)
 3 February — John Millett, poet (died 2019)
 13 February — Marshall Grover, novelist (died 1993) 
 13 April — Max Harris, poet and editor (died 1995)
 23 May — Ray Lawler, playwright
 8 June — Ivan Southall, writer for children (died 2008)
 19 June — Patricia Wrightson, writer for children (died 2008)
27 June — Lex Banning, poet born with cerebral palsy and unable to speak clearly or to write with a pen (died 1965)
 14 August — Ralph Elliott, critic and academic (died 2012)
 30 November – Anne Godfrey-Smith, poet and theatre producer/director (died 2011)
 25 December — Nan McDonald, poet and editor (died 1974)
 26 December — Donald Horne, author (died 2010)

Deaths 

A list, ordered by date of death (and, if the date is either unspecified or repeated, ordered alphabetically by surname) of deaths in 1921 of Australian literary figures, authors of written works or literature-related individuals follows, including year of birth.

 22 March — E. W. Hornung, novelist (born 1866)
 28 March — C. Haddon Chambers, playwright (born 1860)
 18 June — G. Herbert Gibson, poet (born 1846)
 13 September — James Hebblethwaite, poet (born 1857)

See also 
 1921 in poetry
 List of years in literature
 List of years in Australian literature
 1921 in literature
 1920 in Australian literature
 1921 in Australia
 1922 in Australian literature

References

Literature
Australian literature by year
20th-century Australian literature